The Unknown Singer (French: Le chanteur inconnu) is a 1931 French drama film directed by Viktor Tourjansky and starring Lucien Muratore, Simone Cerdan and Jim Gérald.

The film's sets were designed by the art director Serge Piménoff.

Cast 
 Lucien Muratore as Claude Ferval 
 Simone Cerdan as Hélène Corbigny 
 Jim Gérald as Ernest 
 Ghislaine Bru as Beggar woman 
 Pedro Elviro
 Denise Guilloux as Monique 
 Jean-Max as Jacques 
 Alexandre Mathillon as Baliveau 
 Ernest Mezigues
 Serge Piménoff as Fireman 
 Henry Prestat as Riga 
 Simone Simon as Pierette

References

Bibliography 
 Christopher Lloyd. Henri-Georges Clouzot. Manchester University Press, 2007.

External links 
 

1931 films
French drama films
1931 drama films
1930s French-language films
Films directed by Victor Tourjansky
French black-and-white films
Pathé films
Films with screenplays by Henri-Georges Clouzot
1930s French films